Nagewadi is a small village in Tasgaon tahsil of Sangli district (Maharashtra). This village is easily accessible from Miraj-Pandharpur state highway just about 6 km away.

Villages in Sangli district